Joy Plaza is a shopping center located in Sanmin District, Kaohsiung, Taiwan. The mall started trial operation on 5 June 2019, and officially opened on 3 July 2019. The main core stores are Eslite Life, Toys R Us and various themed restaurants. The annual revenue target for the first year is NT$ 1.5 billion. On August 31, 2022, due to impact of the COVID-19 pandemic, the entire Joy Plaza will be closed.

Facilities
The overall space design of the mall is designed by a Japanese team, mainly composed of wood and planting. In the atrium of the entrance hall of Minzu Road, natural light is introduced into the building by a -long arch-shaped transparent lighting cover; beside the escalator, there are theater-style seating seats and a -high large book wall with a total of 40,000 books for reading in the mall. The surrounding trails and green plants extend all the way to the outdoor hiking area.

Gallery

See also
List of tourist attractions in Taiwan
Lovego Plaza

References

External links

2019 establishments in Taiwan
Shopping malls established in 2019
Shopping malls in Kaohsiung

Defunct shopping malls in Taiwan
2022 disestablishments in Taiwan
Shopping malls disestablished in 2022